Amphistium paradoxum (from  , 'on both sides',   'sail', and   'extraordinary'), the only species classified under the genus Amphistium, is a fossil fish which has been identified as a Paleogene relative of the flatfish, and as a transitional fossil. In a typical modern flatfish, the head is asymmetric with both eyes on one side of the head. In Amphistium, the transition from the typical symmetric head of a vertebrate is incomplete, with one eye placed near the top of the head.

Amphistium is among the many fossil fish species known from the Monte Bolca Lagerstätte of Lutetian Italy.  Heteronectes is a related, and very similar fossil from a slightly earlier strata of France.

References

Transitional fossils
Pleuronectiformes
Monotypic ray-finned fish genera
Prehistoric ray-finned fish genera
Eocene fish
Fossils of Italy
Fossil taxa described in 1835
Taxa named by Louis Agassiz